"Don't Tell 'Em" is a song by American singer Jeremih from his third studio album, Late Nights. It features American rapper YG, and was released as the first single from the album. The song peaked at number six on the Billboard Hot 100. Outside the United States, "Don't Tell 'Em" peaked within the top ten of the charts in the United Kingdom, as well as the top twenty of the charts in Australia and Belgium.

Background and composition

Jeremih wrote "Don't Tell 'Em" in January 2014, right after he learned that Kid Ink's "Show Me" (a song Jeremih helped write) went number 1 on the Billboard rap airplay chart.

The artists co-wrote the song with its producers, DJ Mustard and Mick Schultz. "Don't Tell 'Em" is an electro-R&B song with a hip hop production. It contains an interpolation of Snap!'s 1992 single "Rhythm Is a Dancer".

Remix
The official remix features Ty Dolla Sign and French Montana. A music video for the official remix directed by Eif Rivera was released on January 13, 2015. Other remixes include Pitbull, Rick Ross, Migos, G-Unit, Ace Hood and T.I.

Commercial performance
"Don't Tell 'Em" peaked at number six on the Billboard Hot 100 in late October, becoming Jeremih's third top ten hit and YG's first top ten hit. The song was certified double platinum by the Recording Industry Association of America (RIAA). As of April 2014, the song has sold over 1,170,000 copies in the United States.

In the United Kingdom, the song peaked at number five on the UK Singles Chart, becoming Jeremih's first top ten song in Britain.

Cover versions
New Zealand singer Lorde performed a slowed-down cover of the song for Live Lounge on BBC Radio 1 in the United Kingdom.

Track listing
Remixes digital download
 "Don't Tell 'Em" (DaaHype Remix) [featuring YG] [Explicit] – 4:05
 "Don't Tell 'Em" (DaaHype Remix) [featuring YG] [Clean] – 4:02
 "Don't Tell 'Em" (DaaHype Instrumental) [featuring YG]  – 4:07
 "Don't Tell 'Em" (Zoo Station Club) [featuring YG] [Explicit] – 6:10
 "Don't Tell 'Em" (Zoo Station Radio) [featuring YG] [Explicit] – 4:07
 "Don't Tell 'Em" (Zoo Station Club) [featuring YG] [Clean] – 6:09
 "Don't Tell 'Em" (Zoo Station Radio) [featuring YG] [Clean] – 4:06
 "Don't Tell 'Em" (Zoo Station Instrumental) [featuring YG] – 6:10

Charts

Weekly charts

Year-end charts

Certifications

Release history

See also
List of number-one R&B/hip-hop songs of 2014 (U.S.)

References

2014 songs
2014 singles
Jeremih songs
YG (rapper) songs
Song recordings produced by Mustard (record producer)
Cash Money Records singles
Songs written by Mustard (record producer)
Songs written by Mick Schultz
Songs written by Jeremih
Songs written by YG (rapper)